Bryant is a city in Hamlin County, South Dakota, United States. It is part of the Watertown, South Dakota Micropolitan Statistical Area. The population was 471 at the 2020 census. The mayor is named Win Noem.

History
Bryant was laid out in 1887, and named for an agent of the town company.

Geography

Bryant is located at  (44.589916, -97.466401).

Bryant has been assigned the ZIP code 57221 and the FIPS place code 08060.

The city of Bryant was founded in 1886.

Demographics

2010 census
At the 2010 census there were 456 people in 167 households, including 106 families, in the city. The racial makup of the city was 99.6% White and 0.4% from other races. Hispanic or Latino of any race were 0.4%.

Of the 167 households 29.3% had children under the age of 18 living with them, 52.7% were married couples living together, 7.2% had a female householder with no husband present, 3.6% had a male householder with no wife present, and 36.5% were non-families. 34.1% of households were one person and 22.8% were one person aged 65 or older. The average household size was 2.51 and the average family size was 3.28.

The median age was 34.7 years. 30% of residents were under the age of 18; 7.3% were between the ages of 18 and 24; 19.1% were from 25 to 44; 19.1% were from 45 to 64; and 24.6% were 65 or older. The gender makeup of the city was 48.9% male and 51.1% female.

2000 census
At the 2000 census there were 396 people in 172 households, including 94 families, in the city. The population density was 749.7 people per square mile (288.5/km). There were 204 housing units at an average density of 386.2 per square mile (148.6/km).  The racial makup of the city was 99.75% White, and 0.25% African American. 23.5% were of German, 21.3% Norwegian, 16.8% American, 12.8% Finnish, 7.9% Irish and 5.2% English ancestry according to Census 2000.
Of the 172 households 26.7% had children under the age of 18 living with them, 47.1% were married couples living together, 6.4% had a female householder with no husband present, and 44.8% were non-families. 41.3% of households were one person and 27.3% were one person aged 65 or older. The average household size was 2.30 and the average family size was 3.24.

The age distribution was 27.5% under the age of 18, 9.1% from 18 to 24, 21.7% from 25 to 44, 15.4% from 45 to 64, and 26.3% 65 or older. The median age was 40 years. For every 100 females, there were 91.3 males. For every 100 females age 18 and over, there were 88.8 males.

The median household income was $21,719 and the median family income  was $33,393. Males had a median income of $25,208 versus $21,250 for females. The per capita income for the city was $13,989. About 5.7% of families and 9.4% of the population were below the poverty line, including 8.8% of those under age 18 and 8.7% of those age 65 or over.

References

Cities in South Dakota
Cities in Hamlin County, South Dakota
Watertown, South Dakota micropolitan area
1887 establishments in Dakota Territory